Francis James Harrison (August 20, 1912 – May 1, 2004) was an American prelate of the Roman Catholic Church. He served as Bishop of Syracuse from 1977 to 1987.

Biography
One of six children, Francis Harrison was born in Syracuse, New York, to Francis and Mary (née Flynn) Harrison. He graduated from St. Lucy Academy, where he was class president and valedictorian, in 1929. He attended the University of Notre Dame in Indiana, where he played varsity baseball, before entering St. Bernard's Seminary in Rochester in 1931. He was ordained to the priesthood on June 4, 1937. During his priestly ministry, he served as assistant director of Utica Catholic Charities; curate at Our Lady of Mount Carmel in Utica, St. Mary of the Assumption in Binghamton, and the Cathedral of the Immaculate Conception in Syracuse; and founding pastor of St. Andrew the Apostle in Syracuse, St. Patrick in Binghamton, and St. James in Syracuse.

On March 1, 1971, Harrison was appointed Auxiliary Bishop of Syracuse and Titular Bishop of Aquae in Numidia by Pope Paul VI. He received his episcopal consecration on the following April 22 from Bishop David Frederick Cunningham, with Bishops Stanislaus Joseph Brzana and Joseph Lloyd Hogan serving as co-consecrators. Following the resignation of Bishop Cunningham, Harrison was named the seventh Bishop of Syracuse on November 9, 1976. He was installed at the Cathedral of the Immaculate Conception on February 6, 1977. He was the first native of the Syracuse to head the diocese.

Harrison practiced a collegial manner of governing, and worked to include laity and especially women in the diocesan affairs. He launched diocesan programs for African Americans, Hispanic, Native Americans, and the disabled. He once played a game of golf with entertainer Bob Hope, who later recorded a radio ad for the diocese's first HOPE Appeal, an annual fundraiser Harrison started in 1978. In 1980 he called for the United States to cease its aid to El Salvador following the murder of three nuns, declaring, "As Christians and as Americans, we cannot condone our resources and our tax dollars being used to help any foreign government repress its own people so brutally." He later expressed his opposition to military aid for Nicaragua.

Shortly before reaching the mandatory retirement age of 75, Harrison resigned as bishop on June 16, 1987. He later died at St. Camillus Health and Rehabilitation Center, aged 91. He is buried at the St. Agnes Cemetery in Syracuse.

References

1912 births
2004 deaths
Religious leaders from Syracuse, New York
Roman Catholic bishops of Syracuse
Notre Dame Fighting Irish baseball players
20th-century Roman Catholic bishops in the United States